Stanley E. Daniels, II (born November 30, 1984, in San Diego, California) is a former American football guard. He was signed by the St. Louis Rams as an undrafted free agent in 2007. He played college football at Washington.

Daniels has also been a member of the New York Jets, Green Bay Packers and Denver Broncos.

Early years
Daniels prepped at Marian Catholic High School in San Diego.

Personal life
Daniels has a son by the name of Stanley E. Daniels, III.

College career
Daniels played four years as an offensive lineman for Washington. He started 24 of 36 games.

Professional career

St. Louis Rams
Signed with the St. Louis Rams as a College Free Agent on May 1, 2007. Went through a portion of the Rams offseason conditioning program and unofficial and official mini camps before being released on June 23, 2007.

New York Jets
Signed on August 13, 2007 with the New York Jets going through three days of their Training camp before being waived on August 16, 2007.

Signed a future contract with the Jets on January 9, 2008. He competed throughout the entire offseason, training camp, and pre season before being waived on August 30, 2008. Signed the next day on September 1, 2008 to the Practice Squad where he competed for 10 days before being released on September 10. He was signed five days later on September 15 to the Practice Squad where he finished the season.

Completed the entire off season, training camp, and pre season before being released before the beginning of the season on September 5, 2009.

Green Bay Packers

Signed to the Practice Squad on September 28, 2009 and competed on the team until October 27, 2009 where he was released. He later signed again to the Practice Squad on November 11 where competed for the remainder of the season.

Signed with the Packers to a future contract on January 11, 2010. He competed through the offseason activities before being released on May 12, 2010.

Denver Broncos

Claimed off of waivers on May 14 by the Broncos. Completed the remainder of the offseason, training camp, and pre season making the active roster. Saw action and started the first four games at Left Guard. Was declared Inactive for five weeks (games 5, 10, 11, 12, 13). Saw action on Special Teams only in weeks 6, 7, and 8. Was waived on December 12. Signed to the practice squad on December 14 where he competed until December 22. He was signed on the 22nd to active roster.

Portland Thunder
On February 4, 2014, he was assigned to the Portland Thunder of the Arena Football League.

Personal life
Daniels' uncle, Ray May, was an NFL linebacker in the 1960s and 1970s.

References

External links
 Washington Huskies bio

1984 births
Living people
Players of American football from San Diego
American football offensive guards
Washington Huskies football players
St. Louis Rams players
New York Jets players
Denver Broncos players
Cleveland Browns players
Portland Thunder players
Green Bay Packers players